The William H.G. FitzGerald Tennis Center is a tennis venue located in Rock Creek Park in Washington, D.C.  It is named after William H. G. FitzGerald, a Washington-based private investor who was active in philanthropies and served as United States Ambassador to Ireland. It houses 15 hard courts and 10 clay courts. There are also five indoors courts which are heated and available in winter. The main stadium seats 7,500 spectators, including 31 suites with air conditioning. The center is the home of the Citi Open, an annual ATP Tour  and WTA Tour event.

External links 
Rock Creek Park tennis
William H.G. FitzGerald Tennis Center map

Gallery

 Citi Open

Sixteenth Street Heights
Tennis venues in Washington, D.C.
1991 establishments in Washington, D.C.
Sports venues completed in 1991
Rock Creek Park